Borsham is a village in the 'Bays' area of Harris in the Outer Hebrides, Scotland. Borsham is within the parish of Harris. The settlement is situated off the C79, incorrectly known as 'The Golden Road’ which actually runs from Stockinish to Miavaig

Borsham is the birthplace of Scottish Gaelic broadcaster and author, John D Urquhart.

References

External links

Video clip of Borsham from BBC documentary about the life of John D Urquhart.
Canmore - Harris, Borsham site record

Villages in Harris, Outer Hebrides